Nasso may refer to:

People
 Giulio Nasso (1906–1999), American builder
 Julius R. Nasso (born 1952), Italian-American film producer, pharmacologist, and businessman
 Publius Ovidius Nasso, also known as Ovid
 Ray Nasso (born 1987), Australian-Italian rugby player

Places
 Nasso, Italian and former name of Naxos

Other
 Nasso or Naso (parashah)